The 1988 England rugby union tour of Australia and Fiji was a series of nine matches played by the England national rugby union team in Australia and Fiji in May and June 1988. The England team won six of their nine matches and lost the other three. England lost both games in the two–match test series against the Australia national rugby union team but won the test match against the Fiji national rugby union team.

Matches

Touring party

See also
 History of rugby union matches between Australia and England

References

England tour
Rugby union tours of Fiji
England national rugby union team tours of Australia
Tour
tour